Oralkhan Yergaliuly Omirtayev (Oralhan Erğaliūly Ömırtaev; born 16 July 1998) is a Kazakh footballer who plays as a forward for FC Akzhayik.

Club career

Shakhter Karagandy
On 20 November 2018, Omirtayev signed a new one-year contract with Shakhter Karagandy, keeping him at the club until the end of the 2019 season.

Tobol
On 16 December 2019, Omirtayev signed for Tobol. After 18-months with the club, Omirtayev left Tobol on 29 June 2021 after his contract was ended by mutual consent.

Shakhter Karagandy Return
Omirtayev returned to Shakhter Karagandy on 5 July 2021.

International
He made his debut for Kazakhstan national football team on 19 November 2018 in a Nations League game against Georgia, when he came on as an 88th-minute substitute for Maxim Fedin and scored a goal 2 minutes later in a 1–2 loss.

Career statistics

Club

International

Statistics accurate as of match played 13 November 2021

International goals
Scores and results list Kazakhstan's goal tally first.

References

Living people
1998 births
Sportspeople from Karaganda
Kazakhstani footballers
Kazakhstan international footballers
Association football forwards
FC Shakhter Karagandy players
FC Tobol players
Kazakhstan Premier League players
Kazakhstani people of Armenian descent